The M34 is a major highway of Tajikistan and Uzbekistan, that connects the Tajik capital Dushanbe with the Uzbek capital Tashkent.

Roads in Tajikistan
Central Asian highways
Roads in Uzbekistan